Swietenia Puspa Lestari (born 23 December 1994) is an Indonesian underwater diver, environmental engineer and environmental activist.

Life 
Lestari is a native of Pramuka Island in the Java Sea. A keen diver from childhood, she studied environmental engineering at Bandung Institute of Technology, graduating in 2017. She is executive director and co-founder of Jakarta-based Divers Clean Action (DCA) and leads a team of volunteer divers who clear rubbish, especially plastic waste from the reefs and recycle what they find. Beginning with three people in 2015, the DCA has grown to 12 team members and nearly 1,500 volunteers across Indonesia. Lestari related that diving to collect waste can be dangerous because of the high currents, but that the rapid increase in tourism since 2007 has led to far more trash being dumped into the formerly pristine seas around Indonesia's many islands.

In 2017 Lestari founded the Indonesian Youth Marine Debris Summit (IYMDS). The same year, she represented Indonesia and spoke at the 2017 United Nations Climate Change Conference in Bonn, Germany. She also helped initiate an anti-plastic drinking straw campaign in Indonesia and convinced 700 restaurants to reduce the use of single-use straws.

In 2019, Lestari was listed among the BBC's 100 Women, a list of 100 inspiring and influential women. Later that year, she was invited to attend Barack and Michelle Obama's 'Obama Foundation Leaders Forum', which was held in Kuala Lumpur, Malaysia, in December. She was subsequently included in Forbes' "30 Under 30 - Asia - Social Entrepreneurs 2020".

References

External links
 

BBC 100 Women
20th-century Indonesian women
21st-century Indonesian women
1994 births
Bandung Institute of Technology alumni
Underwater divers
Indonesian women environmentalists
Living people
Indonesian engineers
21st-century women engineers
Environmental engineers